Cathays railway station is a station on the Merthyr and Rhondda lines in the Cathays district of Cardiff, Wales.

The station is next to Cardiff University Students' Union and across the road from many Cardiff University buildings, as well as a short walk from the Welsh Government and other civic buildings in Cathays Park. The footbridge over the railway is much used as a shortcut between Park Place and Senghenydd Road. When Cathays opened in 1983 it reversed a trend to close stations. Funded by British Rail and South Glamorgan County Council, construction commenced in April 1983, with the station opened on 3 October 1983.

Cathays station is now staffed during peak hours, since the introduction of a new automated ticket barrier system in summer 2007. Cathays has two platforms, each with a small shelter and an information screen displaying the next train's arrival.

Services

There are bus services from outside the station, including Megabus and National Express.

References

External links

Cardiff University
Railway
Railway stations at university and college campuses
Railway stations in Cardiff
DfT Category E stations
Railway stations in Great Britain opened in 1983
Railway stations opened by British Rail
Railway stations served by Transport for Wales Rail